is a city located in Kamikawa Subprefecture, Hokkaido, Japan.

As of September 2016, the city has an estimated population of 19,794 and the density of 18 persons per km2. The total area is 1119.29 km2.

On September 1, 2005, the town of Asahi was merged into Shibetsu.

History
1899: The last tondenhei village was founded in Shibetsu.
1902: Shibetsu village became a second class village.
1915: The village became Shibetsu town.
1954: Shibetsu town, Kamishibetsu village, Tayoro village, and Onneppu village were merged to form Shibetsu city.
2005: Asahi town was merged into Shibetsu city.

Geography
Shibetsu is located N of Asahikawa and NNE of Sapporo. It is situated by the Shibetsu River in the north and its valley. 
The name comes from the Ainu word for "great river".

Climate

Transportation

Rail
 Sōya Main Line: Shibetsu - Tayoro - Mizuho

Road
Shibetsu is accessed by the Hokkaidō Expressway. The Shibetsu-Kenbuchi Interchange opened on October 4, 2003, connecting the expressway with Route 40. The bypass is not yet planned.

Culture

Mascots

His birthday is July 1. On 24 August 2014, he married Mei-chan at Tsukumosuigo Park.
Her birthday is May 5.
She was born on 1 January 2015. Her checks are her mark point.
Janpun is a farmer boy from Asahi who loves to ski jump. He assists the Asahi Chamber of Commerce and Industry Youth Club. Sahocchi, Mei-chan and Mi-chan depends on him for any advice.

Education

High schools
Hokkaido Shibetsu Shoun High School
Hokkaido Shibetsu Higashi High School

Sister city and friendship city

Sister city
  Goulburn, New South Wales, Australia

Friendship city
  Miyoshi, Aichi Prefecture

References

External links 

 Official Website 

Cities in Hokkaido